Kamenny is a rural locality (a khutor) in Ostrovskoye Rural Settlement, Danilovsky District, Volgograd Oblast, Russia. The population was 168 as of 2010. There are 13 streets.

Geography 
Kamenny is located in steppe, on the left bank of the Medveditsa River, 35 km east of Danilovka (the district's administrative centre) by road. Filin is the nearest rural locality.

References 

Rural localities in Danilovsky District, Volgograd Oblast